Leptostales kinstonensis is a moth of the family Geometridae. It is found on the Antilles and St. Vincent.

Subspecies
Leptostales roseoliva roseoliva
Leptostales roseoliva carnearia Dyar, 1913 (Jamaica)

References

Moths described in 1900
Sterrhinae